James Ambrose McCormick (November 2, 1868 – February 1, 1948) was a 19th-century Major League Baseball Infielder. He played for the St. Louis Browns of the National League in 1892.

External links

1868 births
1948 deaths
19th-century baseball players
Major League Baseball infielders
St. Louis Browns (NL) players
Baseball players from Massachusetts
Baseball players from Maine
Quincy Browns players
Quincy Ravens players
Columbus Buckeyes (minor league) players
Columbus Senators players
Quincy Little Giants players
Newport Colts players
Allentown Peanuts players
People from Spencer, Massachusetts
People from Saco, Maine
Sportspeople from Worcester County, Massachusetts
Ilion Typewriters players